The following is a list of episodes from the paranormal TV series, Sightings. The series ran from 1992–98 and produced several specials and a film, Sightings: Heartland Ghost.

Series overview

Episodes

Fox specials (1991–92)
Sightings premiered on Fox in 1991 as a series of 60 minute paranormal specials.

Season 1 (1992)
After a series of successful specials, Fox premiered the first season of Sightings in the spring of 1992. Each Season 1 episode is 30 minutes, as opposed to the 60 minute length of the specials.

Season 2 (1992–93)
Fox premiered the second season of Sightings in the fall of 1992. Each Season 2 episode is 30 minutes in length.

Season 3 (1994–95)
Season 3 premiered in syndication in the fall of 1994. Each Season 3 episode is now 60 minutes in length.

Season 4 (1995–96)
Season 4 premiered in syndication in the fall of 1995. Each episode is 60 minutes in length. Episodes 90 thru 93 aired exclusively on The Sci-Fi Channel (now SyFy).

Season 5 (1996–97)
Season 5 premiered exclusively on The Sci-Fi Channel (now SyFy) in the fall of 1996. Each episode is 60 minutes in length.

Specials (1996–98)
In 1996, a 30 minute behind-the-scenes special was aired, entitled, Inside Sightings and Beyond.  Five other 120-minute specials aired on the Sci Fi Channel entitled, In Depth and Beyond.

Film (2002)
Released October 27, 2002, this film features the real-life case which took place on location during a shoot for the Heartland Ghost segments on the show.

References

External links
 

Lists of American non-fiction television series episodes
UFO-related television